Anorí is a town and municipality in the Antioquia Department, Colombia. It is part of the subregion of Northeastern Antioquia. The cloud forest near Anorí forms the majority of the range of the endemic, critically endangered chestnut-capped piha.

References

Municipalities of Antioquia Department